Lieutenant General Robert L. Van Antwerp Jr. M.Sc. M.B.A. PE (born January 27, 1950) is an American man who was the Chief of Engineers of the United States Army and Commanding General of the U.S. Army Corps of Engineers.

Early life
He was born in Benton Harbor, Michigan.

Military career
Van Antwerp graduated from the United States Military Academy with a Bachelor of Science degree in 1972, where he was First Captain of Cadets. He completed Ranger, Airborne and Air Assault training and the Engineer Officer Basic and Advanced Courses. He holds a Master of Science degree in mechanical engineering from the University of Michigan and a Master of Business Administration degree from Long Island University in New York. He is a Registered Professional Engineer.  He served for a number of years as President of Officer's Christian Fellowship. One of Van Antwerp's greatest assets is his phenomenal memory.

Van Antwerp's previous assignment was as Commanding General, U.S. Army Accessions Command and Deputy Commanding General for Initial Military Training at Fort Monroe, Virginia. Additionally, Van Antwerp exercised Department of the Army directed executive agent authority over the United States Military Entrance Processing Command. Command assignments include CO, 326th Engineer Battalion, 101st Airborne Division (Air Assault) during the Gulf War; U.S. Army Maneuver Support Center and Fort Leonard Wood/Commandant, U.S. Army Engineer School; CO, Los Angeles District, U.S. Army Corps of Engineers during the Northridge earthquake of 1994; CG, South Atlantic Division, U.S. Army Corps of Engineers, Atlanta, Georgia.

Other assignments include Chief of Staff, U.S. Army Corps of Engineers; Assistant Chief of Staff for Installation Management, Washington, DC; Director, Office of Competitive Sourcing, Office of the Assistant Secretary of the Army (Research, Development and Acquisition), Washington, DC; Executive Assistant to the Vice Chairman of the Joint Chiefs of Staff, Washington, DC; Executive Office, Office of the Chief of Engineers, Washington, D.C.; Chief, Military Engineering and Construction Division, U.S. Army Western Command, Fort Shafter, Hawaii; Executive Officer, 84th Engineer Battalion, 45th General Support Group, Schofield Barracks, Hawaii; and Instructor, Department of Mechanics, U.S. Military Academy, West Point, New York.

Later life
After retiring from military service, he joined the Board of Directors for the Michael Baker Corporation.  He resigned from the board in March 2012 citing a potential conflict of interest.

References

External links

 September 2008 interview with Lt. Gen. Van Antwerp at the Pritzker Military Museum & Library

Living people
United States Army generals
United States Military Academy alumni
University of Michigan College of Engineering alumni
1950 births
United States Army Corps of Engineers personnel
People from Benton Harbor, Michigan
Long Island University alumni
Military personnel from Michigan